Conor Fitzgerald (born 30 September 1997) is an Irish rugby union player for Connacht in the United Rugby Championship. He plays primarily as a fly-half, and represents Shannon in the All-Ireland League.

Early life
Born in Clare, Fitzgerald attended Ardscoil Rís, Limerick, where he was part of the team that lost the 2015 Munster Schools Rugby Senior Cup final to Rockwell College. A former Limerick minor hurler, he represented Munster at Under-18 Clubs, Under-19, Under-20 and 'A' level, as well as representing Ireland at Under-19 and Under-20 level.

Munster
Fitzgerald joined the Munster academy ahead of the 2017–18 season, having made his non-competitive debut for Munster during their pre-season fixture against Italian side Zebre in August 2016. However, Fitzgerald was released from the academy before the end of the 2017–18 season.

Connacht
After leaving Munster, Fitzgerald joined the Connacht academy, and made his competitive debut for the province in their 22–10 win against French side Bordeaux Bègles during the 2018–19 Challenge Cup on 13 October 2018, before making his first start for Connacht one week later in their 34–13 defeat away to English side Sale Sharks. He will join the Connacht senior squad ahead of the 2019–20 season, having signed his first professional contract with the province in April 2019.

Ireland
Fitzgerald made four appearances for Ireland Under-20s during the 2017 Six Nations Under 20s Championship, against Italy, France, Wales and England, whilst also making one appearance, against New Zealand, at the 2017 World Rugby Under 20 Championship.

References

External links
Connacht Profile
Munster Academy Profile
Pro14 Profile

U20 Six Nations Profile

1997 births
Living people
People educated at Ardscoil Rís, Limerick
Rugby union players from County Clare
Irish rugby union players
Shannon RFC players
Connacht Rugby players
Rugby union fly-halves